Hiremagalur Krishnaswamy Kesavan, known as H. K. Kesavan (14 June 1926 – 26 November 2014), was an Indian professor in the Faculty of Engineering at the University of Waterloo, Ontario, Canada.

Early life and education
H.K. Kesavan was born on 14 June 1926 in Bangalore, India. He received his undergraduate degrees in science and engineering from the Central College and the Government Engineering College (now called University Visvesvaraya College of Engineering) in Bangalore.  He received his M.S. degree from the University of Illinois in 1956 and his Ph.D. from Michigan State University in 1959, both in electrical engineering.  He was an instructor at Michigan State from 1956 to 1959, and assistant professor in 1959–1960.

Career

Early career, 1960-1963
In 1960, he was appointed as associate professor at the University of Waterloo, eventually serving as chairman of the Electrical Engineering department.  During this time, he also spent a year back at Michigan State where he finished co-authoring his first book, Analysis of Discrete Physical Systems, co-authored with Herman Koenig and Yilmaz Tokad and published several years later.

IIT Kanpur, 1964-1968
For a period of five years, he returned to India to serve as the first chairman of Electrical Engineering at the Indian Institute of Technology Kanpur and concurrently as head of its nationally significant Computer Centre. He was also the first Dean of Research and Development at the IIT.

Waterloo, 1968-1991
He returned to Waterloo to serve as the founding chairman of the Department of Systems Design engineering.  He has published numerous technical papers and books on systems theory, applications of linear graph theory and entropy optimization principles.

Science and philosophy
Kesavan maintained a lifelong interest in the philosophical aspects of science. His book, Science and Spirituality presents a global view of Vedic philosophy from the insights that science and spirituality provide.

External links
 H.K. Kesavan remembrance, The Globe and Mail, 20 May 2015
 Books and papers (up to 1992) by H.K. Kesavan
 Memorial website (contains extended biography)
 H.K. Kesavan biography from the Spiritual Heritage Education Network

References

University of Illinois alumni
Michigan State University alumni
Indian academics
Academic staff of the University of Waterloo
Academic staff of IIT Kanpur
1926 births
2014 deaths
Indian expatriates in the United States
Indian expatriates in Canada